Villécloye is a commune in the Meuse department in Grand Est in north-eastern France.

Geography
The village lies in the middle of the commune, on the right bank of the Othain, which flows northwestward through the commune, then flows into the Chiers, which forms all of the commune's northern border.

See also
Communes of the Meuse department

References

Communes of Meuse (department)